ATP-binding cassette, sub-family C member 9 (ABCC9) also known as sulfonylurea receptor 2 (SUR2) is an ATP-binding cassette transporter that in humans is encoded by the ABCC9 gene.

Function 

The protein encoded by this gene is a member of the superfamily of ATP-binding cassette (ABC) transporters. ABC proteins transport various molecules across extra- and intra-cellular membranes. ABC genes are divided into seven distinct subfamilies (ABC1, MDR/TAP, MRP, ALD, OABP, GCN20, White). This protein is a member of the MRP subfamily which is involved in multi-drug resistance. This protein is thought to form ATP-sensitive potassium channels in cardiac, skeletal, and vascular and non-vascular smooth muscle. Protein structure suggests a role as the drug-binding channel-modulating subunit of the extrapancreatic ATP-sensitive potassium channels.  Alternative splicing of this gene results in several products, two of which result from differential usage of two terminal exons and one of which results from exon deletion.
 SUR2A — uses exon 38A
 SUR2B — uses exon 38B
 SUR-delta-14 — lack exon 14 and uses exon 38A

Clinical significance 

The gene has been associated with dilated cardiomyopathy and Cantú syndrome.

A variant has also been associated with circa 25 minutes more sleep per day in humans; lack thereof has been associated with three hours less sleep per day in fruit flies.

See also 
 Sulfonylurea receptor

References

Further reading

External links